The Lowry Academy (formerly Harrop Fold School) is a coeducational secondary school located in Salford, Greater Manchester, England, which serves pupils from Little Hulton and Walkden.

The school is named after the noted Salford artist, L.S. Lowry.

History
The school was formed in 2001 from the merger of Joseph Eastham High School in Salford and Little Hulton Community School in Little Hulton. Originally on both former schools' sites, a new building was subsequently constructed on the playing fields of Joseph Eastham High School and the old building demolished in 2008.

The school has a very high proportion of pupils who are economically disadvantaged.

In 2003, Ofsted inspectors told the governing body that Harrop Fold was the "worst school in the country".

In 2005, the school had improved and 94% of teaching was judged satisfactory or better.

In 2010 and again in 2013 the school was judged Good.

In 2018 the headteacher, Drew Povey, was first suspended and then resigned. This was linked to allegations that the school had wrongly recorded information, possibly in order to make results appear better than they were ("off-rolling"). He had served as headteacher since February 2010. Later in the year the school was judged Inadequate and placed back into Special Measures.

Previously a community school administered by Salford City Council, in March 2021 Harrop Fold School converted to academy status. The school is now sponsored by United Learning. In September 2021 the school completed its transformation and was renamed The Lowry Academy, after the Salford-born artist, L.S. Lowry, with a new uniform and logo.

Television coverage
The school featured in Educating Greater Manchester on Channel 4.

References

Further reading
 Povey, Drew (2017) Educating Drew: The real story of Harrop Fold School (John Catt Educational)

External links
The Lowry Academy official website

Secondary schools in Salford
Academies in Salford
Educational institutions established in 2001
United Learning schools
2001 establishments in England